Ivan Lee (born Ivan James Lee, March 31, 1981 in Brooklyn, New York) is an American sabre fencer, referee and coach.

Overview
Ivan Lee was a member of the 2001 U.S. Junior World Sabre team, anchoring the team to its first men's world title at the 2001 Junior World Championships in Gdańsk, Poland, and also becoming the first man of African American descent to win a world fencing championship. He was also a member of the 2004 U.S. Olympic Team in Athens, placing 12th in the individual competition and 4th in the team competition, missing the bronze medal by one point. Ivan was inducted into the United States Fencing Association Hall of Fame in 2014.

Lee graduated from Brooklyn Technical High School in Brooklyn, New York in 1999, earning a full scholarship to St. John's University in Queens, New York. At St. John's, Lee won 2 NCAA individual sabre titles and, along with fellow Olympian and long time clubmate and friend Keeth Smart, led the school to its first Division 1 national championship in 2001. For his accomplishments on the collegiate, national and international levels, he was awarded the USOC's Male Athlete of the Year Award for fencing in 2001. He went on to take double gold at the 2003 Pan American Games in Santo Domingo. He graduated in January 2004 with a bachelor's degree in Journalism.

After failing to qualify for the 2008 Olympic Team, Lee announced his retirement in 2008, but not before winning his final competition, his 6th U.S. National Championship and 5th on the senior level. He holds four (4) world championship medals, and he is the first American male fencer to win a Junior Olympic Championship, a National Championship, an NCAA Championship, a World Championship, a Pan American Championship and make an Olympic Team.

Lee began fencing in 1994, at the Peter Westbrook Foundation (PWF). He continued to serve as a volunteer instructor for the club's Saturday morning classes until June 2018.

Personal
Ivan is the first and only child born to Rev. Desmond Lee and Mrs. Cynthia Lee, happily married since 1980. Rev. Lee, pastor of Ebenezer Missionary Chapel in Brooklyn, is whom Ivan gives credit for getting him to take fencing seriously. Ivan, a big time baseball fan, wanted to play baseball in high school and beyond, but it was his father who saw the scholarship opportunity in fencing and convinced his son to make the decision that would benefit him in the long run.

Mrs. Lee, a retired teacher, staff developer, and administrator in the Brooklyn public school system for over twenty five years, always made it a point to provide options for him. Fellow teacher Audrey Smart, mother of Olympic medalists Erinn Smart and Keeth Smart mentioned to her that her children participated in a non-profit fencing program for children in Manhattan. Mrs. Lee saw the opportunity for her son, and talked him into trying it. He was hooked immediately.

Ivan and his wife, Shameeka, have two children.

Professional and volunteer work
Ivan became a police officer in NYC in July 2008.  He was hired as the Head Women's Fencing Coach at Long Island University in March 2019. He also served as the Fencing Commissioner for the Public Schools Athletic League (PSAL) from 2008 to 2019. The PSAL is the governing body for all public high school sports in New York City. Additionally, he sits on the school board of the Rosalyn Yalow Charter School in the Bronx. His volunteer work has included serving as a youth minister at his church, teaching weekly classes at the fencing club, mentoring high school and college students at the USOC's F.L.A.M.E. (Finding Leaders Among Minorities Everywhere) program, and counseling teenagers at New Horizons Ministries. He was also honored by Indiana University's Office of Strategic Mentoring for a series of mentoring workshops he conducted for the student body in 2005 and 2006.

Awards and honors
2004 U.S. Olympic Team Member
1998, 2001, 2003, 2005, 2006, 2008 U.S. Men's Sabre National Champion
2003 Pan American Men's Sabre Champion
2003 Pan American Men's Sabre Team Champion
2001, 2002 NCAA Men's Sabre Champion
2001 USOC Male Athlete of the Year, Fencing
United States Fencing Association Hall of Fame Inductee, class of 2014

See also
List of USFA Division I National Champions

References

External links
Peter Westbrook Foundation 
U.S. Olympic Team (May 16, 2001): "U.S. Fencing's Lee defeats 2000 Olympic Champion to Win Bronze at World Cup", by Cindy Bent
U.S. Fencing Media: Ivan Lee

1981 births
Living people
American male sabre fencers
St. John's University (New York City) alumni
Olympic fencers of the United States
Fencers at the 2004 Summer Olympics
Pan American Games gold medalists for the United States
Brooklyn Technical High School alumni
Pan American Games medalists in fencing
Fencers at the 2003 Pan American Games
St. John's Red Storm fencers
Medalists at the 2003 Pan American Games